Daddy longlegs or daddy long legs may refer to:

Life forms
 Opiliones or harvestmen, an order of arachnids
 Pholcidae or cellar spiders, a family of spiders
 Crane fly, a family of insects in the order Diptera
 Stylidium divaricatum, a species of triggerplant native to Western Australia
 Caladenia filamentosa, a species of orchid native to Eastern Australia
 Brassavola cucullata, a species of orchid native to Mexico

Literature and film
 Daddy-Long-Legs (novel), a novel by Jean Webster
 Daddy-Long-Legs (1919 film), a silent comedy-drama starring Mary Pickford 
 Daddy Long Legs (1931 film), a musical starring Janet Gaynor and Warner Baxter
 Daddy Long Legs (1938 film), a Dutch romantic comedy
 Daddy Long Legs (1955 film), a musical starring Fred Astaire
 Daddy-Long-Legs (2005 film), a Korean romance
 Daddy Long Legs (musical), a 2009 musical play by John Caird and Paul Gordon 
 Daddy Longlegs (2009 film), a film by Ben and Joshua Safdie
 "Old Father Longlegs", a nursery rhyme by Mother Goose

Music
 Daddy Long Legs (musician), in Wolfpac and Bloodhound Gang
 Daddy Longlegs (album),  by John Craigie
 "Daddy Longlegs", a 1993 song by Tumbleweed
 "Daddy Longlegs", a 2017 song by McCafferty

Other uses
 Daddy Long Legs (horse) (born 2009), a Thoroughbred racehorse
 Daddy Long Legs (sculpture), a 2006 sculpture in Portland, Oregon
 Pioneer, a car on the former Brighton and Rottingdean Seashore Electric Railway

Animal common name disambiguation pages